Elene Khoshtaria (born November 18, 1979, in Tbilisi) is a Georgian politician and the Member of the Parliament of Georgia since 2016. From 2007–2012 she was the first deputy minister in the State Ministry for Euro-Atlantic Integration of Georgia, she was also a candidate in Tbilisi mayoral elections, 2017.

Biography 
She was born on November 18, 1979. Graduated from the Moscow State Institute of International Relations with a degree in International Security. She is a mother of four. In 2002 she worked as an intern in the Moscow Helsinki Group for Human Rights and the Embassy of Georgia in the Russian Federation. Since 2004, she has been the International Relations Coordinator, Head of the International Relations Department at the Ministry of Internal Affairs and Deputy Head of the International Relations Department and Euro-Atlantic Integration. In 2004–2006 she worked at the Office of the State Minister on European and Euro-Atlantic Integration, as a Head of the Euro-Atlantic Integration Department. 2007–2012 – Deputy Minister at Office of the State Minister for European and Euro-Atlantic Integration. In 2012–2016 she worked at the Georgia's Reforms Associates (GRASS).

She has been a member of the Parliament of Georgia since 2016.  She was the member of the Human Rights and Civil Integration Committee and then the member of the Healthcare and Social Issues Committee. In 2017, she was one of only two female mayoral candidates in the Tbilisi Mayoral Elections. She took part in the elections as a candidate from the political party "European Georgia", received 28,411 votes and took the fifth place. Right now she is the candidate of the same party in the 2020 semi-proportional parliamentary elections in Vake District majoritarian constituency. On March 8, 2021, Khoshtaria founded the political movement "Droa!" (The time has come!). Khoshtaria plans to expose corrupt officials, abusers, fraudsters, thieves, clan members, nepotism, ties with Russia, and all kinds of injustices.

External links

References

21st-century politicians from Georgia (country)
Living people
21st-century women politicians from Georgia (country)
1979 births
Moscow State Institute of International Relations alumni